Maria Helena Saarni  (born 8 September 1977) is a Finnish retired ice hockey player. She was a member of the Finnish women's national ice hockey team throughout the 1990s and won a bronze medal at the inaugural Olympic women's ice hockey tournament at the 1998 Winter Olympics. With the national team, she also won bronze at the IIHF Women's World Championship tournaments in 1999 and 2000, and at the 1996 IIHF European Women Championship.

See also 

 List of Olympic women's ice hockey players for Finland

References

External links
 
 
 

1977 births
Living people
Ice hockey people from Helsinki
Finnish women's ice hockey forwards
Ice hockey players at the 1998 Winter Olympics
Medalists at the 1998 Winter Olympics
Olympic bronze medalists for Finland
Olympic ice hockey players of Finland
Olympic medalists in ice hockey
Kiekko-Espoo Naiset players
Espoo Blues Naiset players
Jyväskylän Hockey Cats players
LoKV Naiset players